Kaisersbach is a municipality in the district of Rems-Murr in Baden-Württemberg in Germany.

Points of interest 
 Schwabenpark, an amusement park in Gmeinweiler village, which belongs to Kaiserbach.

References

Rems-Murr-Kreis